FC Bugeac Comrat was a Moldovan football club based in Comrat, Moldova. They played in the Moldovan National Division, the first tier of Moldovan football.

History
The club was founded in 1991. It played one season in the fourth tier of the Soviet league system. In 1992, Bugeac won the first edition of the Moldovan Cup. The club played five seasons in the Moldovan National Division before it was dissolved in 1996.

Honours
Moldovan Cup
Winners (1): 1992

List of seasons

References

Football clubs in the Moldavian Soviet Socialist Republic
Football clubs in Gagauzia
Defunct football clubs in Moldova
Association football clubs established in 1991
Association football clubs disestablished in 1996
1991 establishments in Moldova
1996 disestablishments in Moldova